The Chief of Naval Staff (CNS) is the commander and usually the highest-ranking officer of the Bangladesh Navy. The position is abbreviated as CNS in Bangladesh Navy, and currently held by an Admiral. The current CNS is Admiral M Shaheen Iqbal, who took office on 25 July 2020.

Appointees 
The following table chronicles the appointees to the office of the Chief of the Naval Staff since the independence of Bangladesh. Prior to 2016, from 2007 the appointment was held by a Vice Admiral (three-star naval officer) and from 1972 to 2007 CNS's rank was Rear Admiral.

List of all Chief of Naval Staff of Bangladesh Navy:

See also
 List of serving admirals of the Bangladesh Navy

References

Bangladesh Navy
Bangladesh
Chiefs of Naval Staff (Bangladesh)